Marty Kuehnert (Los Angeles, California) is a current senior advisor to the Japanese professional basketball team Sendai 89es and Japanese professional baseball team Tohoku Rakuten Golden Eagles. He was also the team's first general manager and Nippon Professional Baseball's first foreign general manager.

Biography

Early life and career
Marty Kuehnert grew up in Los Angeles, California and later graduated from Stanford University. While at Stanford, was participated in an exchange student program at Keio University in Tokyo, Japan. While in Japan, Kuehnert met Tsuneo Harada who soon asked him to be the general manager of the Lodi Orions, a Class A Minor League team in the California League and the first Japanese-owned professional franchise in North America. Kuehnert ran the team for two seasons, during which he was named the 1973 California League Executive of the Year. He later went on to be the president and part-owner of another Minor League team, the Birmingham Barons.

Nippon Professional Baseball career
After Kuehnert ran the Lodi Orions, he returned to Japan in 1974 and became the director of sales and promotions for the Taiheiyo Club Lions, a Nippon Professional Baseball (NPB) team based in Fukuoka. While in Japan, Kuehnert continued to excel in sports management and commentary. He went on to write several books, was a sports journalist for major Japanese newspapers, and had his own TV show. In 2004, Hiroshi Mikitani, the founder of Rakuten, approached Kuehnert for sports management advice on his struggling soccer team, Vissel Kobe. After the meeting, Mikitani and Rakuten put forth a bid for a new baseball franchise as a part of the 2004 NPB realignment and asked Kuehnert to be the general manager of the time if they were to win the bid. Mikitani was looking for someone that didn't have a relationship with the old Japanese business community to run the team. In hiring Kuhnert, NPB's first foreign general manager, he hoped to bring "new blood" and "innovative ideas" to Japanese baseball. Kuhnert's approach to the team was analytic and sabermetrics-minded. He was known for his criticisms of Japanese baseball's traditionally intense training methods and hired a like-minded managers and coaches. The Eagle's budget for the year was $22 million, the lowest in NPB. Following a 6–22 start, just over a month into the season, the Eagles removed Kuehnert as general manager and demoted to the role of an advisor.

Other activities
Kuehnert is the vice-president of Sendai University, a school that focuses on preparing students to become coaches. He also teaches sports management and sports media classes at Sendai University as well as Tohoku University.

References

1946 births
Birmingham Barons
Living people
Tohoku Rakuten Golden Eagles
Stanford University alumni
People from Los Angeles